Clohars-Carnoët is a commune in the Finistère department of Brittany in north-western France. The beach resort of Le Pouldu, with the beaches of Bellangenet and Kerrou, is located in the town.

Geography
The commune has two small harbours: Le Pouldu and Doëlan. The Carnoët forest extends partly over the north of the commune. Historically, the village belongs to Cornouaille. The mouth of the river Ellé, called Laïta, forms a natural boundary to the east.

Population
Inhabitants of Clohars-Carnoët are called in French Cloharsiens.

Map

Tourism

The beaches of Bellangenet and Kerrou, in the seaside resort of Le Pouldu, are popular destinations in Summer.

See also
Communes of the Finistère department
Entry on sculptor of war memorial Jean Joncourt
Yann Larhantec Sculptor at calvaries in Clohars-Carnoët
It is the sister town of Dunmore East

References

External links
Official website 
Mayors of Finistère Association  ;

Communes of Finistère